Arthur von Pongrácz de Szent-Miklós und Óvár,  (25 June 1864, Biala, Austria-Hungary  13 January 1942, Vienna) was an Austrian equestrian rider. He competed in Dressage at the 1924, 1928, and 1936 Summer Olympics, with his best performance being 4th place in Men's Team Dressage in 1936 and 6th place in Men's Individual Dressage in 1928. He was also the second oldest athlete ever to compete at the Olympics (in the non-art disciplines), after Oscar Swahn.

References

External links
 Arthur von Pongracz's profile at Sports Reference.com
 Oldest and Youngest Olympians (Summer Games)
 MAGYAR CSALÁDTÖRTÉNETI ADATTÁR

1864 births
1942 deaths
Austrian male equestrians
Hungarian male equestrians
Hungarian dressage riders
Olympic equestrians of Austria
Equestrians at the 1924 Summer Olympics
Equestrians at the 1928 Summer Olympics
Equestrians at the 1936 Summer Olympics
Austrian people of Hungarian descent
Hungarian nobility
People from the Kingdom of Galicia and Lodomeria
People from Biała